Mianrud (also Romanized as Mīānrūd and Meyānrūd; also known as Mianrudan (Persian: میانرودان), also Romanized as Mīānrūdān and Mīān Rūdān) is a city in the Central District of Dezful County, Khuzestan Province, Iran.  At the 2006 census, its population was 9,199, in 1,888 families.

References

Populated places in Dezful County

Cities in Khuzestan Province